Chernava is a rural locality (a village) in Pertsevskoye Rural Settlement, Gryazovetsky District, Vologda Oblast, Russia. The population was 15 as of 2002.

Geography 
Chernava is located 15 km north of Gryazovets (the district's administrative centre) by road. Zvyaglovka is the nearest rural locality.

References 

Rural localities in Gryazovetsky District